Impossible Love is a 1932 German drama film directed by Erich Waschneck and starring Asta Nielsen, Ery Bos and Ellen Schwanneke. It was the final film of Nielsen, and the only sound film she appeared in.  It premiered at the Mozartsaal in Berlin. Neilsen had been a major star during the First World War and the early 1920s but her screen career gradually declined and she hadn't appeared in a film since That Dangerous Age in 1927. Four years after making Impossible Love she returned to her native Denmark. It is also known by the alternative title of Crown of Thorns.

The film is based on the 1929 novel of the same title by Alfred Schirokauer. It was shot at the Johannisthal Studios in Berlin. The film's sets were designed by the art director Hans Jacoby.

Synopsis
The widowed Vera Holgk arrived in Germany from Riga in 1917 and raised her two daughters alone. Working as a successful sculptor she has provided for them, directing her whole energies towards their wellbeing. Now both are grown up, one a cellist and the other employed in a photographic studio, and contemplating marriage. Vera has more free time and after encountering the charming, younger fellow sculptor Professor Steinkampp, she is persuaded to enter a major competition. Over time their relationship develops into a romance. Her daughters are at first disbelieving and not suspicious about the secret affair.

This threatens the respectable marriage her eldest daughter hopes to make. Worse Vera is devastated to discover that Steinkampp is already married, his deranged but loving wife lives in an asylum. Vera visits her and realises that her own relationship is doomed.

Cast
 Asta Nielsen as Vera Holgk
 Ery Bos as Nora, ihre Tochter
 Ellen Schwanneke as Toni, ihre Tochter
 Hans Rehmann as Prof. Steinkampp
 Elisabeth Wendt as Katharina Steinkampp, seine Frau
 Anton Pointner as Leopold von Möllendorf
 Walter Steinbeck as Konsul Werner
 Lotte Spira as Fr. Konsul Werner
 Carl Balhaus as Erwin Hammer
 Hilde Hildebrand as Frl. Martini
 Julius Falkenstein as Zimmermann - Diener von Prof. Steinkampp
 Werner Scharf as Hagedorf, Redakteur der 'Gerechtigkeit'
 Tamara Oberländer
 Katja Bennefeld
 Eugen Burg
 Ernst Behmer
 Alfred Haase
 Friedrich Ettel

References

Bibliography 
 
 Klaus, Ulrich J. Deutsche Tonfilme: Jahrgang 1932. Klaus-Archiv, 1988.

External links 
 

1932 films
1932 drama films
Films of the Weimar Republic
German drama films
1930s German-language films
Films directed by Erich Waschneck
German black-and-white films
Films shot at Johannisthal Studios
1930s German films